George Albert Hildebrand  (September 6, 1878 – May 30, 1960) was an American professional baseball player  and umpire. He played in 11 Major League Baseball games as a left fielder for the 1902 Brooklyn Superbas before becoming an American League umpire from 1913 to 1934. He is often credited as having invented the spitball while playing in the minor leagues. He was the umpire in four World Series (1914, 1918, 1922, 1926), and his 3,331 games as an umpire ranked third in American League history at the time of his retirement.

Baseball career
Born in San Francisco, California, Hildebrand began his playing career in 1898.

Hildebrand worked much of his umpiring career in a team with Brick Owens. His most controversial decision came in Game 2 of the 1922 World Series, when he ended the game on account of darkness after 10 innings with the score tied 3–3, even though it did not begin to get dark until a half-hour later; it was widely believed that the game could have continued for a few more innings. It was later reported that third base umpire Bill Klem had expressed to Hildebrand his concern about a long game, recalling Game 2 of the 1914 Series, which had ended in almost complete darkness after 14 innings. There was such heavy criticism of Hildebrand's decision to end the game that commissioner Kenesaw Mountain Landis ordered the game proceeds ($120,000) to be donated to charity.

Hildebrand was behind the plate on June 21, when Rube Foster of the Boston Red Sox pitched a 2–0 no-hitter against the New York Yankees. He was also behind the plate on July 10,  when Johnny Burnett of the Cleveland Indians collected a record nine hits in an 18-inning game against the Philadelphia Athletics.

Later life
After retiring from baseball, Hildebrand moved into a house in Merced Manor with his wife. He later ran a hotel in Brawley, California, and then went into business in Los Angeles. He died of heart failure at age 81 at Reseda Hospital in Reseda, California, and was survived by his wife Sue and son Albert. He was buried in Valhalla Memorial Park Cemetery.

References

External links

Retrosheet
BaseballLibrary – profile, career highlights and SABR bibliography

1878 births
1960 deaths
Major League Baseball left fielders
Brooklyn Superbas players
Baseball players from San Francisco
Burials at Valhalla Memorial Park Cemetery
Major League Baseball umpires
San Francisco Athletics players
San Francisco A's players
San Francisco Brewers players
San Francisco Wasps players
Providence Grays (minor league) players
Sacramento Gilt Edges players
Sacramento Senators players
San Francisco Seals (baseball) players
Sacramento Cordovas players
Sacramento Sacts players
People from Brawley, California